Mobarakeh (also Romanized as Mobārakeh; also known as Mobārak, Mobarakeh Bafgh, and Mubārak) is a village in Mobarakeh Rural District of the Central District of Bafq County, Yazd province, Iran. At the 2006 National Census, its population was 2,417 in 657 households. The following census in 2011 counted 2,762 people in 836 households. The latest census in 2016 showed a population of 3,301 people in 967 households; it was the largest village in its rural district.

References 

Bafq County

Populated places in Yazd Province

Populated places in Bafq County